Stinking Water Creek or Stinkingwater Creek may refer to:

 Stinking Water Creek (Little White River), a stream in South Dakota
 Stinkingwater Creek (Belle Fourche River), a stream in South Dakota
 Stinking Water Creek, a variant name of the Ruby River